George McAnulty is a former association football player who represented New Zealand at international level.

McAnulty made a solitary official international appearance for New Zealand in a 2–0 win over Fiji on 7 September 1952.

References 

Year of birth missing (living people)
Living people
New Zealand association footballers
New Zealand international footballers
Association footballers not categorized by position